() is a term for the channels through which, in traditional Indian medicine and spiritual theory, the energies such as prana of the physical body, the subtle body and the causal body are said to flow. Within this philosophical framework, the nadis are said to connect at special points of intensity, the chakras. All nadis are said to originate from one of two centres; the heart and the kanda, the latter being an egg-shaped bulb in the pelvic area, just below the navel. The three principal nadis run from the base of the spine to the head, and are the ida on the left, the sushumna in the centre, and the pingala on the right. Ultimately the goal is to unblock these nadis to bring liberation.

Overview 
Nadi is an important concept in Hindu philosophy, mentioned and described in the sources, some as much as 3,000 years old. The number of nadis of the human body is claimed to be up to hundreds-of-thousands and even millions. The Shiva Samhita treatise on yoga states, for example, that out of 350,000 nadis 14 are particularly important, and among them, the three just mentioned are the three most vital. The three principal nadis are ida, pingala, and sushumna. Ida (इडा, iḍā  "comfort") lies to the left of the spine, whereas pingala (पिङ्गल, piṅgala "orange", "tawny", "golden", "solar") is to the right side of the spine, mirroring the ida. Shisimna (shisimṇā "very gracious", "kind") runs along the spinal cord in the center, through the seven chakras. When the channels are unblocked by the action of yoga, the energy of kundalini uncoils and rises up the sushumna  from the base of the spine.

The nadis play a role in yoga, as many yogic practices, including shatkarmas, mudras and pranayama, are intended to open and unblock the nadis. The ultimate aim of some yogic practices are to direct prana into the sushumna nadi specifically, enabling kundalini to rise, and thus bring about moksha, or liberation.

Early references 

Several of the ancient Upanishads use the concept of nadis (channels). The nadi system is mentioned in the Chandogya Upanishad (8~6 cc. BCE), verse 8.6.6. and in verses 3.6-3.7 of the Prasna Upanishad (second half of the 1 millennium BC). As stated in the last,

The medieval Sat-Cakra-Nirupana (1520s), one of the later and more fully developed classical texts on nadis and chakras, refers to these three main nadis by the names Sasi, Mihira, and Susumna.

Functions and activities

In hatha yoga theory, nadis carry prana, life force energy. In the physical body, the nadis are channels carrying air, water, nutrients, blood and other bodily fluids around and are similar to the arteries, veins, capillaries, bronchioles, nerves, lymph canals and so on. In the subtle and the causal body, the nadis are channels for so-called cosmic, vital, seminal, mental, intellectual, etc. energies (collectively described as prana) and are important for sensations, consciousness and the spiritual aura.

Yoga texts disagree on the number of nadis in the human body. The Hatha Yoga Pradipika and Goraksha Samhita quote 72,000 nadis, each branching off into another 72,000 nadis, whereas the Shiva Samhita states 350,000 nadis arise from the navel center, and the Katha Upanishad (6.16) says that 101 channels radiate from the heart.

The Ida and Pingala nadis are sometimes in modern readings interpreted as the two hemispheres of the brain. Pingala is the extroverted (Active), solar nadi, and corresponds to the right side of the body and the left side of the brain. Ida is the introverted, lunar nadi, and corresponds to the left side of the body and the right side of the brain.

Three channels (nadis)

Central channel (Sushumna) 

Sushumna is the central and most important channel. It connects the base chakra to the crown chakra. It is important in Yoga and Tantra.

Side channels

Left channel (Ida) 

Ida is associated with lunar energy. The word ida means "comfort" in Sanskrit. Idā has a moonlike nature and feminine energy with a cooling effect. It courses from the left testicle to the left nostril and corresponds to the Ganges river.

Right channel (Pingala) 
Pingala is associated with solar energy. The word pingala means "orange" or "tawny" in Sanskrit. Pingala has a sunlike nature and masculine energy. Its temperature is heating and courses from the right testicle to the right nostril. It corresponds to the river Yamuna.

Unblocking the channels

The purpose of yoga is moksha, liberation and hence immortality in the state of samadhi, union, which is the meaning of "yoga" as described in the Patanjalayayogasastra. This is obstructed by blockages in the nadis, which allow the vital air, prana, to languish in the Ida and Pingala channels. The unblocking of the channels is therefore a vital function of yoga. The various practices of yoga, including the preliminary purifications or satkarmas, the yogic seals or mudras, visualisation, breath restraint or pranayama, and the repetition of mantras work together to force the prana to move from the Ida and Pingala into the central Sushumna channel. The mudras in particular close off various openings, thus trapping prana and directing it towards the Sushumna. This allows kundalini to rise up the Sushumna channel, leading to liberation.

Other traditions and interpretations 

Other cultures work with concepts similar to nadis and prana.

Chinese 
Systems based on Traditional Chinese Medicine work with an energy concept called qi, analogous to prana. Qi travels through meridians analogous to the nadis. The microcosmic orbit practice has many similarities to certain Indian nadi shuddha (channel clearing) exercises and the practice of Kriya Yoga.

Tibetan 
Tibetan medicine borrows many concepts from Yoga through the influence of Tantric Buddhism. One of the Six Yogas of Naropa is a cleansing of the central channel called phowa, preparing the soul to leave the body through the sagittal suture.

The Vajrayana practice of Trul Khor is another practice used to direct and control the flow of energy within the body's energetic meridians through breath control and physical postures.

European 
Sometimes the three main nadis are related to the Caduceus of Hermes: "the two snakes of which symbolize the kundalini or serpent-fire which is presently to be set in motion along those channels, while the wings typify the power of conscious flight through higher planes which the development of that fire confers".

See also 
 Aura
 Mudra

Notes and references

Sources 

Sandra, Anderson (2018). "The Nadis: Tantric Anatomy of the Subtle Body". Himalayan Institute. Retrieved April 2, 2021.
"The Three Main Nadis: Ida, Pingala and Sushumna". Hridaya Yoga France. Retrieved 2021-04-03.
"The Ida and Pingala". Yin Yoga. Retrieved 2021-04-03.

Mysticism
Chakras
Yoga concepts